Quebrada Tenerife is an intermittent stream near Cerro El Viejo, Cerro Tenerife and Cerro El Guamal. It is located in Mérida State (Venezuela). It takes its name from the island of Tenerife (Spain).

See also
 Geography of Venezuela

References

Geography of Mérida (state)
Rivers of Venezuela